Johann Gottfried Freiherr von Guttenberg (6 November 1645 – 14 December 1698) was the Prince-Bishop of Würzburg from 1684 until his death.

The House of Guttenberg was a prominent Franconian noble family, named after Guttenberg Castle. Johann Gottfried was born at Marloffstein Castle.

In the Nine Years' War, the Prince-Bishop allied with the Emperor (Leopold I) and provided him with troops.  He died in Würzburg, aged 53.

1645 births
1698 deaths
Prince-Bishops of Würzburg
Burials at Würzburg Cathedral
Dukes of Franconia
Barons of Germany
Johann Gottfried